Zdětín is a municipality and village in Prostějov District in the Olomouc Region of the Czech Republic. It has about 400 inhabitants.

History
The first written mention of Zdětín is from 1368. A school was built in 1876.

References

External links

Villages in Prostějov District